Gary Grant Emmons (born December 30, 1963) is a Canadian former professional ice hockey player who played for the San Jose Sharks of the National Hockey League (NHL), as well as several teams in the International Hockey League (IHL).

Career statistics

Regular season and playoffs

Awards and honours

References

External links

1963 births
Canadian ice hockey centres
Kalamazoo Wings (1974–2000) players
EC KAC players
Kansas City Blades players
Living people
Milwaukee Admirals (IHL) players
National Hockey League supplemental draft picks
New York Rangers draft picks
Northern Michigan Wildcats men's ice hockey players
Nova Scotia Oilers players
Prince Albert Raiders players
San Jose Sharks players
Ice hockey people from Winnipeg
Swift Current Broncos players
Canadian expatriate ice hockey players in Austria
AHCA Division I men's ice hockey All-Americans